Thomas of York may refer to:

Thomas of Bayeux (d. 1100), aka Thomas I of York, Archbishop of York
Thomas II of York (d. 1114), Archbishop of York, nephew of Thomas I.  Sometimes called "Thomas the Younger"
Thomas of York (Franciscan), 13th-century theologian and philosopher